Thunder in the Valley may refer to:

 An annual motorcycle rally in Johnstown, Pennsylvania, USA
 A fireworks show in Crowsnest Pass, Alberta, Canada
 Thunder in the Valley (film), a 1947 film